Edward Raymond Müller (June 23, 1911 – April 1, 1991) known professionally as Eddie Miller, was an American jazz musician who played tenor saxophone and clarinet.

Early life
Miller was born in New Orleans, Louisiana. In his early teens, Miller got a job selling newspapers, so he would be eligible for a newsboys' band.

Career 
Miller professional career began in New Orleans at 16, with his recording debut occurring in 1930 with Julie Wintz. He worked in Ben Pollack's orchestra and then stayed when Bob Crosby took over its leadership. He stayed with Crosby until the band broke up in 1942. He had his own band for a brief time after that, before being drafted. However, he was discharged from the military early because of illness and settled in Los Angeles. After that he worked with Pete Fountain, appeared in most of Crosby's reunions, and did club work. He also played with trumpeter Al Hirt.

Miller was also a songwriter, with his best-known song being "Slow Mood," later known as "Lazy Mood" after Johnny Mercer noticed the tune and composed lyrics. Miller was inducted into the Big Band and Jazz Hall of Fame in 1998.

He won numerous Playboy and Esquire Jazz polls. Miller finished his career with Pete Fountain, living in New Orleans. While with the Pete Fountain organization, he was featured as the lead saxophonist at the 1971 and 1972 Greenwood Arts Festivals (Greenwood, Mississippi). Digitized recordings are available through the Delta Jazz Collection.

Personal life 
Miller died at age 79 in Van Nuys, of pneumonia.

Discography

As leader
 Frat Hop (Tops, 1957)
 Armand Hug and His New Orleans Dixielanders/Eddie Miller and His New Orleans Rhythm Pals (Southland, 1958)
 Tenor of Jazz (Fontana, 1967)
 With a Little Help from My Friend with Pete Fountain (Coral, 1968)
 A Portrait of Eddie (Blue Angel, 1970)
 Just Friends with Armand Hug (Land O' Jazz, 1976)
 Wild Bill Davison and Eddie Miller Play Hoagy Carmichael (Realtime, 1981)
 Street of Dreams with Johnny Varro (Magna Graphic Jazz, 1982)
 The Eddie Miller Quartet Plays Mostly Ellington (Audiophile, 2003)

As sideman
 Heinie Beau, Blues for Two (Henri, 1983)
 Jack Lesberg, Hollywood Swing (Famous Door, 1978)
 Ray Linn, Empty Suit Blues (Discovery, 1981)
 Si Zentner, In Person (International Award, 1962)

References

External links
Eddie Miller Interview NAMM Oral History Library (1984)
Eddie Miller recordings at the Discography of American Historical Recordings.

1911 births
1991 deaths
American jazz clarinetists
American jazz saxophonists
American male saxophonists
American male jazz musicians
Big band bandleaders
Delmark Records artists
Dixieland clarinetists
Dixieland saxophonists
Dixieland jazz musicians
Jazz musicians from New Orleans
Swing clarinetists
Swing saxophonists
World's Greatest Jazz Band members
20th-century American saxophonists
20th-century American male musicians
Southland Records artists
Coral Records artists
Fontana Records artists